Salampsio (Hebrew: שלומציון, Shlomtzion) was the eldest daughter of Herod the Great by his royal Hasmonean wife, Mariamne I.  

She was married to Phasael, the son of Phasael, Herod's brother (her uncle).  The marriage resulted in five children: Antipater, Herod, Alexander, Alexandra, and  Cypros. Cypros married Herod Agrippa, the son of Aristobulus IV and was the mother of Herod Agrippa II, Berenice, Mariamne, and Drusilla; and Alexandra married Timius of Cyprus.

References

Ancient Jewish women 
Herodian dynasty
Herod the Great